"Midnight in Montgomery" is a song written by American country music singer Alan Jackson and Don Sampson, and recorded by Jackson. It was released in April 1992 as the fourth single from Jackson's second album, Don't Rock the Jukebox. The song peaked at number 3 on the Billboard Hot Country Singles & Tracks chart (the album's only single not to top the chart), and number 3 as well on the Canadian RPM Country Tracks chart.

In August 2020, Josh Turner recorded a cover version of "Midnight In Montgomery" on his album Country State of Mind.

Content
This song was written about Hank Williams, who was from Montgomery, Alabama. It is a mid-tempo, largely acoustic ballad in the key of D minor.

The singer, while heading to Mobile for a New Year's Eve show, makes a visit to a Montgomery grave (Williams died on New Year's Day 1953, and is buried in Montgomery), and encounters the ghost of Williams who thanks him for paying tribute before disappearing. The song also references several Williams hits, including "I'm So Lonesome I Could Cry." The song ends with the words "Hank's always singing there".

Critical reception
Leeann Ward of Country Universe gave the song an A grade, saying that "the song’s story is fascinating in and of itself, but equally impressive is the recording as a whole package." She goes on to say that "along with the ominous production and chilling story, Jackson’s performance strays from its usual smooth reliability and picks up its own haunting quality, which perfectly adds to the overall darkness of the song."

Music video
The music video was directed by Jim Shea and premiered in April 1992. It was filmed in black and white under a full moon amidst the headstones of an empty cemetery. It went on to win that year's Country Music Association award for Music Video of the Year. They had to record the video twice, in the first take, there was a shadow that wasn't supposed to be in the video.

Peak chart positions
"Midnight in Montgomery" debuted on the U.S. Billboard Hot Country Singles & Tracks for the week of April 25, 1992.

Year-end charts

References

1992 singles
Alan Jackson songs
Josh Turner songs
Songs written by Alan Jackson
Songs written by Don Sampson
Song recordings produced by Scott Hendricks
Song recordings produced by Keith Stegall
Arista Nashville singles
Black-and-white music videos
1991 songs
Songs about ghosts
Songs about Hank Williams